Nanette Gartrell is an American psychiatrist, researcher, lesbian activist and writer. Gartrell is the author of over 70 research reports on topics ranging from medical student depression to sexual minority parent families to sexual exploitation of patients by healthcare professionals. Her investigation into physician misconduct led to a clean-up of professional ethics codes and the criminalization of boundary violations. For this work, she was featured in a PBS "Frontline" documentary My Doctor, My Lover.

Gartrell is also the author of My Answer Is NO. . . . If That's Okay with You: How Women Can Say NO with Confidence. The Nanette K. Gartrell papers, a collection of Gartrell's personal, professional, and political life, are archived in the Sophia Smith Collection, Smith College, Northampton, Mass.

Education and affiliations 
Gartrell attended Stanford University (class of 1971) and the University of California, trained at Harvard, and has been a Williams Institute Visiting Distinguished Scholar at the UCLA School of Law since 2009. She has had a guest appointment at the University of Amsterdam since 2009. She served on the faculty of Harvard Medical School from 1976 to 1987, and was on the faculty at the University of California, San Francisco, from 1988 to 2011. Gartrell has a private psychiatry practice, and for 13 years volunteered her psychiatric services to chronically mentally ill homeless people. An experience in one of these shelters became the basis for her piece in the San Francisco Chronicle Magazine, "A Tenderloin Tail."

Research 

Gartrell is the Principal Researcher for the US National Longitudinal Lesbian Family Study (NLLFS). The NLLFS follows lesbian mothers and their children who were conceived by donor insemination during the 1980s. The study, which was initiated by Gartrell in 1986, examines the social, psychological, and emotional development of the children as well as the dynamics of planned lesbian families. This is the longest-running and largest prospective investigation of lesbian mothers and their children in the United States.

In June 2010, the NLLFS study The USA National Longitudinal Lesbian Family Study: Psychological Adjustment of the 17-Year-Old Adolescents was published in Pediatrics. The study's results showed that the 17-year-olds of lesbian mothers were rated significantly higher in social, school/academic, and total competence and significantly lower in social problems, rule-breaking, aggressive, and externalizing problem behavior than their age-matched counterparts. This publication prompted international media attention including articles in The Los Angeles Times, The Telegraph (UK), Time, and mention on The Colbert Report. Discover Magazine then named this story as one of the top 100 stories of 2010—#88: Same-Sex Parents Do No Harm.

In 2012, UCLA Today published an article "Researcher sorts out fact from fallacy in three-decade study of lesbian families" highlighting Gartrell's 30+ years of work on the NLLFS study.

Publications

Selected scholarly articles (co-authored) 

 Bos, HMW, Kuyper, L, & Gartrell, NK (2017).  A population-based comparison of female and male same-sex parent and different-sex parent households. Family Process, doi: 10.1111/famp.12278.
 Bos, H.M.W., Knox, J.R., van Rijn-van Gelderen, L., Gartrell, N.K. (2016) Same-Sex and Different-Sex Parent Households and Child Health Outcomes: Findings from the National Survey of Children's Health, Journal of Developmental & Behavioral Pediatrics, Volume 37, Issue 3, 1-9.
 van Rijn-van Gelderen, L., Bos, H.M.W., & Gartrell, N. (2015) Dutch adolescents from lesbian-parent families: How do they compare to peers with heterosexual parents and what is the impact of homophobic stigmatization?, Journal of Adolescence, 40, 65-73.
 Gartrell, N., Bos, H., Goldberg, N., Deck, A., van Rijn-van Gelderen. (2014). Satisfaction with known, open-identity, or unknown sperm donors: reports from lesbian mothers of 17-year-old adolescents. Fertility and Sterility.
 Bos, H., van Gelderen, L., Gartrell, N. (2014) Lesbian and Heterosexual Two-Parent Families: Adolescent–Parent Relationship Quality and Adolescent Well-Being. Journal of Child and Family Studies. DOI: 10.1007/s10826-014-9913-8.
 Bos H, Gartrell N, van Gelderen L. (2013) Adolescents in Lesbian Families: DSM-Oriented Scale Scores and Stigmatization. Journal of Gay & Lesbian Social Services, 25:2, 121-140.
 Van Gelderen, L., Gartrell, N., Bos, H.M.W., Hermanns, J. (2013). Stigmatization and Promotive Factors in Relation to Psychological Health and Life Satisfaction of Adolescents in Planned Lesbian Families. Journal of Family Issues, 34, 809-827. doi: 10.1177/0192513X12447269
 Gartrell N, Bos H, Peyser H, et al. (2012) Adolescents with Lesbian Mothers Describe Their Own Lives. Journal of Homosexuality, 59:9, 1211–1229.
 Bos H, Goldberg N, van Gelderen L, Gartrell N. (2012) Male Role Models, Gender Role Traits, and Psychological Adjustment. Gender & Society. DOI: 10.1177/0891243212445465.
 van Gelderen, L, Bos H, Gartrell N, et al. (2012) Quality of Life of Adolescents Raised from Birth by Lesbian Mothers. Journal of Developmental & Behavioral Pediatrics. 33(1):1-7.
 Gartrell N, Bos H, Goldberg N. (2011) New Trends in Same-Sex Sexual Contact for American Adolescents? Archives of Sexual Behavior. DOI 10.1007/s10508-011-9883-5.
 Gartrell N, Bos H, Peyser, H, et al. (2011) Family Characteristics, Custody Arrangements, and Adolescent Psychological Well-being after Lesbian Mothers Break Up. Family Relations. 60:572-585. .
 Goldberg NG, Bos HMW, Gartrell NK. (2011) Substance use by adolescents of the USA national longitudinal lesbian family study. Journal of Health Psychology. .
 Bos H.M.W, Gartrell N.K (2010) Adolescents of the US National Longitudinal Lesbian Family Study: the impact of having a known or an unknown donor on the stability of psychological adjustment. Human Reproduction. .
 Gartrell N, Bos H, Goldberg N. (2010) Adolescents of the U.S. National Longitudinal Lesbian Family Study: Sexual Orientation, Sexual Behavior, and Sexual Risk Exposure. Archives of Sexual Behavior. .
 Bos H, Gartrell N. (2010) Adolescents of the USA National Longitudinal Lesbian Family Study: Can Family Characteristics Counteract the Negative Effects of Stigmatization? Family Process. 49:559–572.
 Gartrell N, Bos H. (2010) US National Longitudinal Lesbian Family Study: Psychological Adjustment of 17-Year-Old Adolescents. Pediatrics. 126(1):1-9.
 Van Gelderen L, Gartrell N, Bos H, et al. (2009) Stigmatization and resilience in adolescent children of lesbian mothers. Journal of GLBT Family Studies. 5(3):268-279.
 Bos HMW, Gartrell NK, Peyser H, et al. (2008) The USA national longitudinal lesbian family study: Homophobia, psychological adjustment, and protective factors. Journal of Lesbian Studies. 12(4):455-471.
 Bos HMW, Gartrell N, Van Balen F, Peyser H, et al. (2008) Children in planned lesbian families: A cross-cultural comparison between the USA and the Netherlands. American Journal of Orthopsychiatry. 78(2):211-219.
 Gartrell N, Rodas C, Deck A, et al. (2006) The USA national lesbian family study: 5. Interviews with mothers of ten-year-olds. Feminism & Psychology. 16(2):175-192.
 Gartrell N, Deck A, Rodas C, et al. (2005) The national lesbian family study: 4. Interviews with the 10-year-old children. American Journal of Orthopsychiatry. 75:518-524.
 Gartrell N, Banks A, Reed N, Hamilton J, et al. (2000) The national lesbian family study: 3. Interviews with mothers of five-year-olds. American Journal of Orthopsychiatry. 70:542-548.
 Gartrell N, Banks A, Hamilton J, et al. (1999) The national lesbian family study: 2. Interviews with mothers of toddlers. American Journal of Orthopsychiatry. 69:362-369.
 Gartrell N, Hamilton J, Banks A, et al. (1996) The national lesbian family study: 1. Interviews with prospective mothers. American Journal of Orthopsychiatry. 66:272-281.
 Gartrell NK, Milliken N, Goodson 3rd WH, Thiemann S, Lo B. Physician-patient sexual contact. Prevalence and problems. Western Journal of Medicine. 1992 Aug;157(2):139.

Books 
In 2008, Gartrell wrote My Answer Is No…If That’s Okay with You , a book written to help women learn to say "no" with confidence. The book, published by Simon & Schuster, featured interviews with successful and prominent women, including former Supreme Court Justice Sandra Day O’Connor, international AIDS activist Mary Fisher, best-selling author Danielle Steel, President of the Center for the Advancement of Women Faye Wattleton, Wall Street Journal contributing editor Peggy Noonan, breast cancer surgeon Dr. Susan Love, former First Lady Barbara Bush, and others.

As part of the promotion for the book, Gartrell appeared on Good Morning America, and was interviewed for numerous radio and TV programs around the country.

Gartrell is also the editor of Bringing Ethics Alive: Feminist Ethics in Psychotherapy Practice; and the co-editor of Everyday Mutinies.

Awards and honors 

 (2008) One of the Ten Most Powerful Lesbian Doctors, Curve magazine.<ref>[http://backup.curvemag.com/Detailed/907.html Curve Magazine: Ten Most Powerful Lesbian Doctors]</ref>
 (2008) American Psychological Association (Division 44) Distinguished Scientific Contribution Award.
 (2010) Pediatrics publication by Drs. Gartrell and Bos cited as one of top 100 science stories of the year by Discover magazine.
 (2013) Association of Women Psychiatrists Presidential Commendation Award, American Psychiatric Association.
 (2014) Drs. Gartrell and Mosbacher were the co-recipients of the Mathew O. Tobriner Public Service award from the Legal Aid Society, Employment Law Center.
 (2014) Gay Lesbian Medical Association Achievement Award.
 (2017) United Kingdom LGBT History Posters.

 Personal life 

Gartrell is married to Dee Mosbacher  MD, Ph.D., a documentary filmmaker whose film Straight From the Heart'' was nominated for an Academy Award in 1994. The two live together in San Francisco, CA.

References

External links 
 National Longitudinal Lesbian Family Study (NLLFS) – official website
 My Answer Is NO.... If That's Okay with You (book) – official website

American psychiatrists
LGBT physicians
American LGBT rights activists
American lesbian writers
Living people
Harvard Medical School alumni
Harvard Medical School faculty
Year of birth missing (living people)
21st-century American women writers